Chris McMeekin (married Whittingham; born 1 December 1956) is a British middle-distance runner. She competed in the women's 800 metres at the 1976 Summer Olympics.

References

1956 births
Living people
Athletes (track and field) at the 1976 Summer Olympics
British female middle-distance runners
Olympic athletes of Great Britain
Sportspeople from Glasgow